Stefan J. M. Swanepoel  (born January 5, 1958), is an American business executive, author and real estate businessperson. He has served as president of two non-profit organizations and seven companies, including a New York-based global franchise network. He is most known as a business and trends author, having written more than 20 books and reports. His books have been listed on the New York Times  and Wall Street Journal bestseller lists.

Early life
Swanepoel was born in Nairobi, Kenya.  He holds a bachelor's degree in science from the University of Pretoria, a master's degree in business economics from the University of Johannesburg, and diplomas in arbitration, mergers and acquisitions, real estate, computer science] and marketing. Swanepoel has been an industry researcher of real estate trends for over three decades  and is recognized as a global real estate expert. His Swanepoel Trends Report is an annual analysis of how changes impact the real estate business and affect real estate brokers, agents and home buyers.

Trends
Swanepoel is a proponent of the evolution of the Internet, mobile technology] and transparency of information in the home-buying transaction. In 1998 Swanepoel predicted that technology and consolidation would be the single biggest change catalysts the real estate industry would experience. In 2006 Swanepoel warned that large numbers of agents were entering the real estate industry, and in 2009 he wrote that far too many agents were licensed and that this was dragging down overall productivity, standards and the image of real estate agents in general. Research in two markets found that more than half of all licensed agents had no listings or sales during the previous year  and that every year hundreds of thousands of agents never even sell one house. Swanepoel has often stated that the real estate brokerage industry has a "merry-go-round approach" because it is too easy to get a real estate agent license; he believes it is too easy to move from one company to another. Throughout his various reports Swanepoel has forecast that newspapers and other print media will be the biggest casualty of reduced advertising dollars and the growth of the Internet

In 2007 Swanepoel detailed new business models as a fundamental business trend in the industry and warned that real estate brokers clinging to the traditional model with old compensation plans, large infrastructure and many physical locations were going to see their market share erode. Despite the entry of new data aggregators and Web portals, that Swanepoel predicted and supports, he has dating back to the 90s also been a strong proponent that real estate agents have an important role in the home buying transaction. He said that the 2014 acquisition of Trulia by Zillow and of Move (company) by News Corp was beneficial to buyers and sellers of homes, because it would improve innovation and the quality of real estate information.

Industry Rankings

The Swanepoel Power 200 (SP200) is an annual list of the 200 most powerful people in residential real estate in northern America (United States and Canada). The list is described as the most comprehensive list  of influential CEOs, thought leaders and senior executives ever assembled in the residential real estate brokerage business. The rankings  are based on multiple criteria that take into account the individual's personal influence, his/her tenure in the industry, the office he or she holds, the decision-making power of said office, the financial resources of the company or organization, the company or organization's significance and contribution to the industry, the company's geographic reach, and his or her recent activities, growth, and potential.

D.A.N.G.E.R. Reports

A study that analyzes the residential real estate business and outlines the 50 largest threats to the business was released by the  National Association of Realtors during their May 2015 annual Legislative meetings in Washington. NAR functions as a self-regulatory organization for residential real estate brokerage industry and with over 1.1 million members, is the largest trade association in the United States. The report, titled the D.A.N.G.E.R. Report (acronym for Definitive Analysis of Negative Game Changers Emerging in Real Estate) was researched and authored by Stefan Swanepoel.
A similar study of the residential real estate market in Canada was commissioned by the Canadian Real Estate Association. The report identifying 36 specific threats and challenges for brokers and agents was released in March 2016.

Partial bibliography
 Real Estate confronts Reality (Dearborn Publishing, 1997) 
 Real Estate confronts the e-Consumer (RealSure Publishing, 2000) 
 Real Estate confronts the Future (The Thomson Corporation, 2004) 
 Swanepoel Trends Report 2006 (RealSure Publishing) 	
 Swanepoel Trends Report 2007 (RealSure Publishing) 
 Swanepoel Trends Report 2008 (RealSure Publishing) 
 Swanepoel Trends Report 2009 (RealSure Publishing) 
 Swanepoel Social Media Report 2010 (RealSure Publishing) 
 Swanepoel Trends Report 2010 (RealSure Publishing) 
 Swanepoel Trends Report 2011 (RealSure Publishing) 
 Surviving your Serengeti: 7 Skills to Master Business and Life. (John Wiley & Sons, 2011), 
 Swanepoel Trends Report 2012 (RealSure Publishing) 
 Swanepoel Trends Report 2013 (RealSure Publishing) 
 Swanepoel Technology Report 2013 (RealSure Publishing) 
 Swanepoel Power 200 for 2013/14 (RealSure Publishing) 
 Swanepoel Trends Report 2014 (RealSure Publishing) 
 Swanepoel Power 200 for 2014/15 (RealSure Publishing) 
 Swanepoel Trends Report 2015 (RealSure Publishing) 
 T3 Tech Guide 2015 (RealSure Publishing) 
 D.A.N.G.E.R. Report - United States (RealSure Publishing and National Association of Realtors) 
 Swanepoel Power 200 for 2015/16 (RealSure Publishing) 
 Swanepoel Trends Report 2016 (RealSure Publishing) 
 D.A.N.G.E.R. Report - Canada (RealSure Publishing and Canadian Real Estate Association) 	
 Swanepoel Power 200 for 2016/17 (RealSure Publishing) 
 Swanepoel Trends Report 2017 (RealSure Publishing) 
 Swanepoel Trends Report 2018 (RealSure Publishing) 
 Swanepoel Trends Report 2019 (RealSure Publishing) 
 Swanepoel Trends Report 2020 (RealSure Publishing) 
 Real Estate Almanac 2020 (RealSure Publishing) 
 Swanepoel Trends Report 2021 (T3 Sixty) 
 Real Estate Almanac 2021 (T3 Sixty) 
 Swanepoel Trends Report 2022 (T3 Sixty) 
 Real Estate Almanac 2022 (T3 Sixty)

References

External links
 Swanepoel
 Real Estate Trends
 SP200
 Surviving Your Serengeti
 Danger Report Updated URL 
 National Association of Realtors website

Afrikaner people
American business writers
American motivational speakers
American real estate businesspeople
Businesspeople from Los Angeles
1958 births
Living people
South African emigrants to the United States
People from Nairobi
University of Pretoria alumni